The Aerolites AeroSkiff is an American two-seat ultralight amphibian built by Aerolites Inc. The aircraft is sold either completed or as a kit for home builders.

Design and development
The Aeroskiff is a braced high-wing monoplane powered by a Rotax 582 driving a pusher propeller. It has an open cockpit for a pilot and passenger and a retractable landing gear for land or sea operation.

The aircraft is too heavy for the Fédération Aéronautique Internationale microlight rules and its repositionable landing gear means it cannot fit into the US light-sport aircraft rules.

Operational history
By 1998 the company had reported that two examples were flying.

Specifications

See also

References

Notes

External links

AeroSkiff
1990s United States civil utility aircraft
Amphibious aircraft
Single-engined pusher aircraft
High-wing aircraft
Homebuilt aircraft
Flying boats